The Fifth Affiliated Hospital of Xinjiang Medical University is a teaching hospital in Urumqi, Xinjiang, China affiliated with Xinjiang Medical University.

External links 
 Hospital profile

Xinjiang Medical University
Hospital buildings completed in 1960
Hospital XMU 5
Hospitals in Xinjiang
Hospitals established in 1960
1960 establishments in China